The 1856 United States presidential election in Vermont took place on November 4, 1856, as part of the 1856 United States presidential election. Voters chose five representatives, or electors to the Electoral College, who voted for president and vice president.

Vermont voted for the Republican candidate, John C. Frémont, over the Democratic candidate, James Buchanan, and the Know Nothing candidate, Millard Fillmore. Frémont won the state by a margin of 57.12%. 

With 77.96% of the popular vote, Vermont would be his strongest victory in the Union in terms of percentage in the popular vote.

Frémont's victory also started the 104 year long streak of Republican presidential candidate victories within the Green Mountain State, which would last for 27 consecutive presidential elections from 1856 through 1960--as of 2020, still the most of any state. A Democratic presidential candidate would not win Vermont until Lyndon B. Johnson won the state against Barry Goldwater 108 years later in 1964.

Results

See also
 United States presidential elections in Vermont

References

Vermont
1856
1856 Vermont elections